In maritime transport terms, and most commonly in sailing, jury-rigged is an adjective, a noun, and a verb. It can describe the actions of temporary makeshift running repairs made with only the tools and materials on board; and the subsequent results thereof. The origin of jury-rigged and jury-rigging lies in such efforts done on boats and ships, characteristically sail powered to begin with. Jury-rigging can be applied to any part of a ship; be it its super-structure (hull, decks), propulsion systems (mast, sails, rigging, engine, transmission, propeller), or controls (helm, rudder, centreboard, daggerboards, rigging).

Similarly, after a dismasting, a replacement mast, often referred to as a jury mast (and if necessary, yard) would be fashioned, and stayed to allow a watercraft to resume making way.

Etymology
The phrase 'jury-rigged' has been in use since at least 1788.  The adjectival use of 'jury', in the sense of makeshift or temporary, has been said to date from at least 1616, when according to the 1933 edition of the Oxford Dictionary of the English Language, it appeared in John Smith's A Description of New England.  It appeared in Smith's more extensive The General History of Virginia, New-England, and the Summer Isles published in 1624.    

Two theories about the origin of this usage of 'jury-rig' are:
A corruption of jury mast; i.e., a mast for the day, a temporary mast, being a spare used when the mast has been carried away.  From French : 'a day'.
From the Latin : 'to aid'; via Old French : 'help' or 'relief'.

Rigging

Depending on its size and purpose, a sail-powered boat may carry a limited amount of repair materials, from which some form of jury-rig can be fashioned.  Additionally, anything salvageable, such as a spar or spinnaker pole, could be adapted to carrying a form of makeshift sail.

Ships typically carried a selection of spare parts, e.g., items such as topmasts. Example jury-rig configurations include:
A spare topmast
The main boom of a brig
Replacing the foremast with the mizzenmast (mentioned in W. Brady's The Kedge Anchor (1852))
The bowsprit set upright and tied to the stump of the original mast.

The jury mast knot may provide anchor points for securing makeshift stays and shrouds to support a jury mast, although there is differing evidence of the knot's actual historical use.

Jury-rigs are not limited to boats designed for sail propulsion.  Any form of watercraft found without power can be adapted to carry jury sail as necessary.  In addition, other essential components of a boat or ship, such as a rudder or tiller, can be said to be 'jury-rigged' when a repair is improvised out of materials at hand.

Similar phrases

The compound word 'jerry-built', a similar but distinct term, referring to things 'built unsubstantially of bad materials', has a separate origin from jury-rigged. The exact etymology is unknown, but it is probably linked to earlier pejorative uses of the word 'jerry', attested as early as 1721, and may have been influenced by 'jury-rigged'.
The American terms 'Afro engineering' (short for African engineering) or 'nigger-rigging' describes a fix that is temporary, done quickly, technically improperly, or without attention to or care for detail. It can also describe shoddy, second-rate workmanship, with whatever materials happen to be available. 'Nigger-rigging' originated in the 1950s United States; the term was euphemized as 'afro engineering' in the 1970s and later again as 'ghetto rigging'. The terms have been used in the U.S. auto mechanic industry to describe quick makeshift repairs. These phrases have largely fallen out of common usage due to their racist, pejorative nature.
To 'MacGyver' (or MacGyverize) something is to rig up something in a hurry using materials at hand, from the title character of the American television show of the same name, who specialized in such improvisation stunts.
In New Zealand, having a 'Number 8 wire' mentality means to have the ability to make or repair something using any materials at hand, such as standard farm fencing wire.

See also
Sailing ship accidents
Bricolage – creations from whatever happens to be available
Exaptation – a shift in the function of a trait during evolution
Rube Goldberg – an American cartoonist known for drawing complicated machines used for simple purposes
Heath Robinson – a British artist known for drawing complicated machines used for simple purposes
Jugaad – an Indian-based word for adopting innovative or simple fixes that may bend certain rules
Kludge – inelegant solutions that are difficult to maintain
MacGyver in popular culture
Repurposing
Robinsonade – a literary genre named after the novel Robinson Crusoe
Tofu-dreg project – a phrase used in Mainland China to describe a poorly constructed building
Upcycling – the transformation of waste into something usable for environmental preservation

References

Further reading

External links

Sailing rigs and rigging
Nautical terminology